Boris Barać (born 21 February 1992) is a Croatian professional basketball player for Falco KC Szombathely of the Hungarian first division and the Basketball Champions League. Standing at 2.06 m, he plays at the power forward position. His older brother Stanko Barać was also a professional basketball player. He grew up at HKK Široki, and signed a three-year contract with Zadar in 2014.

References

External links
 Profile at abaliga.com
 Profile at eurobasket.com
 Profile at realGM

Living people
1992 births
ABA League players
Basketball Nymburk players
Basketball players from Mostar
CB Bahía San Agustín players
Croatian expatriate basketball people in Spain
Croatian men's basketball players
Falco KC Szombathely players
FC Porto basketball players
HKK Široki players
KK Cibona players
KK Zadar players
People from Široki Brijeg
Power forwards (basketball)